Keita or Keïta may refer to:

People
 Keita (given name)
 Keita (surname)

History 
 Keita Dynasty, a ruling lineage of Mali

Geography 
 Keita Department, a region of Niger
 Keita, Niger, a town in Keita department

Politics 
 Keita Integrated Development Project, a food security project in Niger

Entertainment 
 Keïta! l'Héritage du griot, a 1995 Burkinabé film by Dani Kouyaté

Sport 

 Centre Salif Keita, a Malian football club
 Pavillon des sports Modibo Keita, a Malian indoor sporting arena
 Stade Centre Salif Keita, a Malian football stadium
 Stade Modibo Kéïta, a Malian multi-purpose sports stadium